Father Serge (French: Le père Serge) is a 1945 French historical drama film directed by Lucien Ganier-Raymond and starring Jacques Dumesnil, Mila Parély and Marcel Herrand. It is based on the short story Father Sergius by Leo Tolstoy. It was shot at the Saint-Maurice Studios and Studio François 1 in Paris. The film's sets were designed by the art director Robert-Jules Garnier.

Synopsis
Prince Stéphane, a rising figure at the court of Nicholas I is shocked when he discovers the Tsar has had an affair with his fiancée. He renounces all world interests and retires to a monastery, become a wondering monk who is valued for his faith and his abilities as a healer. When he discovers that his former love is serious ill in St Petersburg he heads there at once.

Cast
 Jacques Dumesnil as Le prince Stéphane
 Mila Parély as La baronne Vera Kourianev
 Ariane Borg as 	La comtesse Marie Korotkova
 Marcel Herrand as 	Le tsar Nicolas Pavlovitch Romanoff I
 Louis Salou as 	Le comte Fedor Ivanovitch Kedrov
 Arlette Marchal as 	La tsarine
 Madeleine Lambert as 	La comtesse Varvara Alexandrovna Kedrov
 Armand Bernard as 	Aphamazy

References

Bibliography
 Goble, Alan. The Complete Index to Literary Sources in Film. Walter de Gruyter, 1999.

External links 
 

1945 films
1940s French-language films
1945 drama films
1940s historical drama films
French historical drama films
Films set in Russia
Films set in the 19th century
Films shot at Saint-Maurice Studios
1940s French films